Harold Edwin Standish (24 September 1919 – 15 April 1972) was a Canadian poet and novelist, best known for his 1949 novel The Golden Time and his long poem The Lake of Souls (1957). A significant Canadian modernist along with the likes of Earle Birney, Douglas LePan, and Sheila Watson, Standish was known for his experiments with literary form and skeptical views of Canadian nationalism at a time, during the 1950s and 60s, when many Canadians sought to establish a distinctive literary tradition for Canada. Largely forgotten in recent years, his work remains significant for its vivid evocations of working class life in rural Southern Ontario.

Early life
Standish was born in Toronto, but shortly thereafter moved with his family to Chatham, Ontario. In an autobiographical essay in A View From the Edge (1971), Standish describes how his alcoholic father beat him and his three brothers mercilessly, leaving lifelong psychological wounds that found expression in many of Standish's poems. After leaving high school at age fourteen, Standish worked as an apprentice to a millwright, before setting off on a cross-Canada excursion by train in 1937. Settling in Vancouver for a time, Standish had trouble finding employment because of the lingering Great Depression. Returning to Ontario after the outbreak of World War II, he attempted to enlist for overseas service but was rejected because of a heart murmur. Standish instead spent the early years of the war working on tobacco farms in the area around Lake Erie, an experience that would later influence the setting of his first novel, The Golden Time.

Literary career
A voracious reader since childhood, Standish began writing poetry in his teens but did not consider it a serious pursuit until after a chance meeting with the young Earle Birney in Vancouver. Birney encouraged Standish to write more intensely and introduced him to the work of Wyndham Lewis, James Joyce, T. S. Eliot and other writers that came to influence Standish's work. While working as a laborer in Ontario, Standish kept copious drafts of poems and notes for short stories, but lack of formal education prevented him from developing the distinctive style he sought. In 1943, Standish moved back to his birthplace of Toronto, where he enrolled in English literature courses at the University of Toronto while writing and working at a variety of temporary jobs.

A number of Standish's poems appeared in such little magazines as Contemporary Verse and Northern Review, and he released his first self-financed collection, a mimeographed chapbook entitled Stripped Bare in the Afterlife in 1943. Despite the chapbook having sold a mere sixty copies, Standish managed to land a publishing agreement with the tiny imprint Bluenose Books for the release of his first full-length monograph, Neighbours and Other Poems (1944). Several other collections followed over the next two decades.

By the late forties, Standish had added fiction to his creative pursuits. His first novel, The Golden Time, published by Macmillan in 1949, sold well and won glowing reviews, although it failed to win that year's Governor General's Award for fiction, the prize going instead to Standish's friend Philip Child. The 1950s was Standish's most productive period, with another novel and several more poetry collections appearing to growing acclaim — but poor sales. After a short period as a full-time, professional author, Standish found it necessary to supplement his income with work as a copy-editor and labourer. Standish continued to write and publish throughout the 1960s, however, including essays for various Canadian and American periodicals that were collected later in A View From the Edge.

Decline and death
Standish was stricken with liver disease in the mid-1960s and was increasingly confined to hospitals and long periods at his home outside Toronto. His wife, Marilla Standish, assisted him in preparing his manuscripts for publication, but eventually Standish's health declined even further as his heart began to deteriorate. The latter condition inspired the ironic title of his final book of new poetry, A Crisis at Heart (1970, published in Europe as Autumn Moon). Shortly before his death he chose the poems for the book Selected Poems. In the introduction to that volume, Miriam Waddington claimed that Standish was "a voice destined to last in Canadian literature," although his death in 1972 caused much of his work to be forgotten. To date, no re-prints of Standish's original works have appeared, although a final selection of poems and essays, Harold Standish: A Retrospective, appeared in 1976.

Bibliography

Fiction
The Golden Time (1949)
Blues For Loretta (1954)

Non-fiction
A View from the Edge (essays, 1971)

Poetry
Stripped Bare in the Afterlife (chapbook, 1943)
Neighbours and Other Poems (1944)
The Forest of Fear (1947)
Amelia's Gone (1951)
The Wonder of the Wind (1955)
The Lake of Souls and Other Poems (1957)
New and Newer Poems (1962)
A Crisis at Heart (1970) (U.K. title: August Moon, 1971)
Selected Poems (1971)
Harold Standish: A Retrospective (poems and essays, posthumous 1976)

Notes

References
McKenzie, Marwan. "'Trembling in Eden': Echoes of Kierkegaard in the Poetry of H.E. Standish." Journal of Canadian Studies 15.4 (1975): 118–36.
Waddington, Miriam. Introduction to The Selected Poems of Harold Standish. Ottawa: Algonquin Press, 1971.
Scott, Douglas M. Harold Standish: A Life in Letters. Toronto: Ryerson, 1970.
Viger, Maureen, ed. Coming of Age in Canada: Poets of the Fifties. Toronto: Contact Press, 1960.

External links
 Poems by Harold Standish

1919 births
1972 deaths
Canadian male novelists
20th-century Canadian poets
Canadian male poets
Writers from Toronto
20th-century Canadian novelists
20th-century Canadian male writers